Marie Moore (born May 1, 1967) is a former international butterfly swimmer from Canada.  Moore competed at the 1984 Summer Olympics in Los Angeles, California, finishing in 13th position in the women's 200-metre butterfly.  A year earlier, she had won a bronze medal in the same event at the 1983 Pan American Games in Caracas, Venezuela.

References
 Canadian Olympic Committee

External links
 
 
 
 
 

1967 births
Living people
Canadian female butterfly swimmers
Olympic swimmers of Canada
People from Sydney, Nova Scotia
Sportspeople from the Cape Breton Regional Municipality
Swimmers at the 1983 Pan American Games
Swimmers at the 1984 Summer Olympics
Pan American Games bronze medalists for Canada
Pan American Games medalists in swimming
Medalists at the 1983 Pan American Games
20th-century Canadian women